Jean-Paul Fouchécourt is a French tenor, mostly as an opera singer. He was born on 30 August 1958 at Blanzy in the Burgundy region. He is best known for singing French Baroque music, especially the parts called in French haute-contre, written for a very high tenor voice with no falsetto singing.

Life and career
Specialist in French Baroque repertory, Jean-Paul Fouchécourt has gained his international reputation with his portrayal of the title role Platée by Rameau, Arnalta in l’Incoronazione di Poppea by Monteverdi, the four servants in the Tales of Hoffmann by Offenbach and le Mari in the Mamelles de Tirésias by Poulenc.

After studying the classical saxophone and conducting, Jean-Paul Fouchécourt decided to become a singer after a workshop with Cathy Berberian in 1982. He began his career with Les Arts Florissants directed by William Christie in 1986, having concerts in Europe, US, Soviet Union, South America, Australia and Japan. Jean-Paul Fouchécourt then went on to work extensively with the conductor Marc Minkowski and his Musiciens du Louvre: highlights of his career in the Baroque repertory include the title roles of Hippolyte et Aricie by Rameau, Titon et l’Aurore by Mondonville, Acis et Galatée by Lully and Resurrezione by Handel. He has also collaborated with other Baroque ensembles directed by R. Alessandrini, H. Bicket, R. Brown, P. Herreweghe, G. Garrido, N. McGeggan, R. Jacobs, S. Kuijken, H. Niquet, T. Pinnock, Ch. Rousset and JC. Spinosi.

Jean-Paul Fouchécourt has performed with many of the world’s leading opera companies, including Royal Opera House - London, Metropolitan Opera, City Opera - New York, Cincinnati Opera, Opera Bastille, Théâtre des Champs-Élysées, Théâtre du Châtelet in Paris, Opéra de Bordeaux, Opéra de Lyon, Opéra du Rhin, and Opéra de Montpellier, Théâtre de la Monnaie, Vlaams Opera, Grand Théâtre de Genève, Lausanne Opera and Zurich Opera, Netherlands Opera, Theater an der Wien, New Israeli Opera and Australian Opera.

His operatic productions have included L'enfant et les sortilèges and L'heure Espagnole (Torquemada) by Ravel, Le Nozze di Figaro (Basilio) by Mozart, Orphée aux Enfers (Pluton) by Offenbach, Falstaff (Bardolfo) by Verdi, Manon (Guillot de Morfontaine) by Massenet, Madame Butterfly (Goro) by Puccini, Eugene Onegin (Monsieur Triquet) by Tchaikovsky, L'étoile (Ouf 1er) by Chabrier, Calisto (Pane) by Cavalli, and The Golden Cockerel (The astrologer) by Rimsky-Korsakov.

Jean-Paul Fouchécourt has also performed at many music festivals including Aix-en-Provence, Chorégies d'Orange (France), Berkley (USA), Saito Kinen (Japan), BBC Proms, Edinburgh (UK), and Salzburg (Austria).

He has a great affinity and love of French songs, from the Baroque Air de cour and Classical Romance to the Romantic mélodie. He has performed recitals in France and around the world.

His discography of more than 100 recordings includes works from Monteverdi, Mondonville, Rameau, Fauré, Bizet, Boulanger, Delage, Poulenc, Offenbach, Ravel, and Rosenthal to Szymanowski.
In 2000, Jean-Paul Fouchécourt was honoured with the 'Chevalier de l’ordre National du Mérite' by the French Government.

He became the Artistic Director of the Studio de l’Opéra de Lyon (SOL) in 2011.

Selected recordings

Solo recitals
 Rameau: Operatic Arias.  Opera Lafayette Orchestra, Ryan Brown
 Airs de Cour des XVI, XVII, XVIII Siecles. Éric Bellocq

Among the many Baroque operas and vocal pieces that Fouchécourt has recorded are:
Atys by Jean-Baptist Lully, conducted by William Christie (1987) Harmonia Mundi
David et Jonathas by Marc-Antoine Charpentier, conducted by William Christie (1988) Harmonia Mundi
The Fairy-Queen by Purcell, conducted by William Christie (1989) Harmonia Mundi
Alcyone by Marin Marais, conducted by Marc Minkowski (1990) Erato
Te Deum by De Lalande, conducted by William Christie  (1991) Harmonia Mundi
Titon et l'Aurore by Jean-Joseph Cassanéa de Mondonville, conducted by Marc Minkowski (1992) Erato
Les amours de Ragonde by Jean-Joseph Mouret, conducted by Marc Minkowski (1992) Erato
Les Indes Galantes by Jean-Philippe Rameau, conducted by William Christie (1992) Harmonia Mundi
Idoménée by André Campra, conducted by William Christie (1992) Harmonia Mundi
Te Deum by Marc-Antoine Charpentier, conducted by William Christie (1992) Harmonia Mundi
Pigmalion by Rameau, conducted by Hervé Niquet (1993) Fnac / re-release from Virgin Classics/EMI (1999)
Phaëton by Lully, conducted by Marc Minkowski (1993) Erato
Hippolyte et Aricie by Rameau, conducted by Marc Minkowski (1994) Archiv
Dido and Aeneas by Purcell, conducted by William Christie (1995) Erato
Les Fêtes de Paphos by Mondonville, conducted by Christophe Rousset (1997) L'Oiseau-Lyre
Les Fêtes d'Hébé by Rameau, conducted by William Christie (1998) Erato
Acis & Galatée by Lully, conducted by Marc Minkowski (1998) Archiv
Orphée et Euridice (1774 Paris version) by Gluck, conducted by Ryan Brown (2005) Naxos

Other recordings include:
La cambiale di matrimonio by Gioachino Rossini, conducted by Hervé Niquet (1991) ADDA
La dame blanche by Boïeldieu, conducted by Marc Minkowski (1996) EMI Classics/Angel
Les mamelles de Tirésias by Francis Poulenc, conducted by Seiji Ozawa (1999) Philips
Orphée aux enfers by Offenbach conducted by Marc Minkowski (1998) EMI
Roméo & Juliette by Berlioz, conducted by John Eliot Gardiner (1998) Polygram
Maurice Delage: Mélodies, with Billy Eidi (1998) Timpani
Werther by Massenet, conducted by Antonio Pappano (1999) EMI Classics
Herodiade by Massenet conducted by Michel Plasson (2001) EMI Classics
Rodrigue et Chimène by Debussy conducted by Kent Nagano (1993–94) Erato
Songs by Fauré - Aubade, Chanson d'amour, Les présents, Lydia, Mai, Nell, with Graham Johnson (2005) Hyperion
La Vie Parisienne by Offenbach, conducted by Sébastien Rouland (2008, DVD) Virgin Classics
L'enfant et les sortilèges by Ravel, conducted by Simon Rattle (2009) EMI Classics
Enoch Arden, melodrama by Richard Strauss, with Christian Ivaldi, piano
Carmen by Bizet, conducted by Antonio Pappano (2004) DVD
Carmen by Bizet, conducted by Simon Rattle EMI (2012)
Eugène Onguin byTchaikowsky conducted by Valery Gergiev (2007) DECA DVD

Saxophone
Works by Creston, Pierné, Schmitt recorded in 1981, 1984.

External links
www.fouchecourt.com Official Site
Askonas Holt

 (French television 2009).

1958 births
Living people
People from Saône-et-Loire
French operatic tenors
French male singers
French male conductors (music)
21st-century French conductors (music)
21st-century French male musicians